Don Valley West is a federal electoral district in Ontario, Canada, that has been represented in the House of Commons of Canada since 1979. Its population in 2001 was 115,539. 13.6% of the population is Muslim, the highest in Canada.

Its most high-profile MPs have been John Bosley, who was Speaker of the House 1984-86 and John Godfrey, who served in the cabinet of Prime Minister Paul Martin as a Minister of State.

Demographics
According to the Canada 2021 Census

Ethnic groups: 52.4% White, 13.3% South Asian, 12.3% Chinese, 5.3% West Asian, 3.8% Black, 3.5% Filipino, 2.1% Latin American, 1.6% Korean, 1.5% Arab
Languages: 55.1% English, 4.6% Mandarin, 4.3% Urdu, 2.8% Persian, 2.8% Cantonese, 1.9% Spanish, 1.7% Arabic, 1.7% Tagalog, 1.4% French, 1.2% Korean, 1.1% Russian, 1.1% Pashto, 1.1% Portuguese
Religions: 41.3% Christian (17.5% Catholic, 4.5% Anglican, 4.5% Christian Orthodox, 3,7% United Church, 1.0% Presbyterian, 8.0% Other), 16.5% Muslim, 6.3% Jewish, 2.2% Hindu, 31.8% None 
Median income: $47,600 (2020)

Average income: $113,600 (2020)

Geography
The district includes the neighbourhoods of York Mills, Silver Hills, the western half of Don Mills, the eastern half of Lawrence Park, Leaside, and Thorncliffe Park in the City of Toronto–mostly in the former municipalities of North York and East York. The area is 37 km².

History
The federal electoral district was created in 1976 from Don Valley riding.

John Godfrey, who had represented the riding since 1993, announced in November 2007 that he would be resigning his seat on July 1, 2008 in order to accept a position as headmaster of Toronto French School and would leave earlier if an election were called before that date.  Godfrey subsequently postponed his resignation until August 1.

On August 17, 2008, the Prime Minister's Office issued a press release on behalf of Prime Minister Stephen Harper announcing a by-election for Don Valley West on September 22, 2008. The by-election was canceled with the announcement of the federal election to be held on October 14, 2008.

This riding lost significant territory to Don Valley East and gained territory from St. Paul's during the 2012 electoral redistribution.

Former boundaries

Members of Parliament

This riding has elected the following Members of Parliament:

Election results

	
	

					

Note: Conservative vote is compared to the total of the Canadian Alliance vote and Progressive Conservative vote in 2000 election.

Note: Canadian Alliance vote is compared to the Reform vote in 1997 election.

See also
 List of Canadian federal electoral districts
 Past Canadian electoral districts

References

Notes

External links
Federal riding history from the Library of Parliament
2015 Results from Elections Canada
 Campaign expense data from Elections Canada

Federal electoral districts of Toronto
Ontario federal electoral districts
1976 establishments in Ontario